Knight of Shadows is a fantasy novel by Roger Zelazny.

Knight of Shadows may also refer to:
 The Knight of Shadows: Between Yin and Yang, a 2019 Chinese film
 "Knight of Shadows", an episode of seaQuest DSV

See also
 Shadow Knight (disambiguation)